Mthethwa may refer to:
 Mthethwa Paramountcy, a Southern African state that arose in the 18th century south of Delagoa Bay and inland in eastern southern Africa
 Nathi Mthethwa, South African minister of police from 2008